Treves Butte is a prominent, partly ice-covered butte (2,100 m) immediately northwest of Discovery Ridge in the Ohio Range. Named by Advisory Committee on Antarctic Names (US-ACAN) for Samuel B. Treves, geologist, who worked several seasons in Antarctica and who in the 1960-61 and 1961-62 seasons made investigations in the Ohio Range and other parts of the Horlick Mountains.

Buttes of Antarctica
Landforms of Marie Byrd Land